Sujeh (also Romanized as Sūjeh) is a village in Oshnavieh-ye Shomali Rural District, in the Central District of Oshnavieh County, West Azerbaijan Province, Iran. At the 2006 census, its population was 489, in 69 families.

References 

Populated places in Oshnavieh County